Oligodon albocinctus, also known as the light-barred kukri snake, is a species of colubrid snake. It is endemic to Asia. The species was first described by Theodore Cantor in 1839.

Geographic range 
It is found in Nepal, Bhutan, Bangladesh, Northeast India, Myanmar, Vietnam, and China (Tibet, Yunnan).

References

Further reading 
 Boulenger, George A. 1890. The Fauna of British India, Including Ceylon and Burma. Reptilia and Batrachia. (Taylor & Francis, Printers). London. xviii + 541 pp.
 Cantor, T.E. 1839. Spicilegium serpentium indicorum [parts 1 and 2]. Proc. Zool. Soc. London 7: 31–34, 49–55.

Albocinctus
Snakes of Asia
Reptiles of Bangladesh
Reptiles of Bhutan
Snakes of China
Reptiles of India
Reptiles of Myanmar
Reptiles of Nepal
Snakes of Vietnam
Reptiles described in 1839
Taxa named by Theodore Edward Cantor